is a Japanese politician of the Liberal Democratic Party, a member of the House of Representatives in the Diet (national legislature). A native of Nishinomiya, Hyogo and graduate of Kansai University, he was elected to the House of Representatives for the first time in 2005 after serving in the city assembly of Itami, Hyogo.

References

External links 
  in Japanese.

1958 births
Living people
People from Nishinomiya
Koizumi Children
Kansai University alumni
Japanese municipal councilors
Politicians from Hyōgo Prefecture
Members of the House of Representatives (Japan)
Liberal Democratic Party (Japan) politicians